This is a list of FM radio stations in the United States having call signs beginning with the letters WW through WZ. Low-power FM radio stations, those with designations such as WWBJ-LP, have not been included in this list.

WW

WX

WY

WZ

See also
 North American call sign

Lists of radio stations in the United States